The 2017 NatWest T20 Blast was the 2017 season of the T20 Blast, a professional Twenty20 cricket league in England and Wales. It was the fourth season in which the domestic T20 competition, run by the ECB, has been branded as the NatWest T20 Blast. The league consisted of the 18 first-class county teams divided into two divisions of nine teams each with fixtures played between July and September. Ahead of the final round of fixtures, 15 teams were still in a position to qualify for the quarter-finals. The finals day took place at Edgbaston Cricket Ground in Birmingham on 2 September 2017. Nottinghamshire Outlaws were the competition winners.

Competition format
The 18 competing teams were initially split into 2 divisions (North and South), each containing 9 teams, for the group stage of the competition. During the group stage (from July to September) each club played six of the other teams in the same division twice, once at a home stadium and once at a home ground of their opponents. They played the other two teams only once, for a total of 14 games each. Teams received two points for a win and one point for a tie or if a match was abandoned. Teams were ranked within their groups by total points, then net run rate. At the end of the group stage, the top four teams from each group entered the knockout stage of the competition.

Teams

North Division

Table

South Division

Table

Knockout stage

References

External links

2017 in English cricket
2017
NatWest T20 Blast